Julio César Pardini Sandoval  (born April 25, 1984, in Guasave, Sinaloa) is a former Mexican professional footballer who played in the forward position for Cafetaleros de Tapachula of Ascenso MX.

References

Liga MX players
Living people
1984 births
Footballers from Sinaloa
People from Guasave
Mexican footballers
Association football forwards
Mexican people of Italian descent